Leucophoebe is a genus of longhorn beetles of the subfamily Lamiinae, containing the following species:

 Leucophoebe albaria (Bates, 1872)
 Leucophoebe kempfi Lane, 1976
 Leucophoebe pictilis (Lane, 1972)

References

Hemilophini